Arctophila is a genus of Arctic and Subarctic plants in the grass family. The only known species is Arctophila fulva, commonly known as pendant grass, native to northern parts of Eurasia and North America (Russia, Finland, Sweden, Svalbard, Greenland, Alaska, Canada).

See also 
 List of Poaceae genera

References 

Pooideae
Flora of Eastern Europe
Flora of Northern Europe
Flora of the Russian Far East
Flora of Siberia
Flora of Subarctic America
Flora of Western Canada